The grey-crowned flatbill or grey-crowned flycatcher (Tolmomyias poliocephalus) is a species of bird in the family Tyrannidae.
It is found in humid forest in the Amazon and Atlantic Forest in South America. It closely resembles the yellow-margined and yellow-olive flatbills, but its lower mandible is dark with a pale base. It is a fairly common bird with a wide range and the International Union for Conservation of Nature has rated it as "least concern".

Description
Tolmomyias flatbills are robust small birds with broad beaks. The iris is usually a pale colour and the mandible has a dark tip. Several species of flatbill overlap in their range and are easily confused with each other visually, but their songs are mostly distinctive. The grey-crowned flatbill's song is a series of whistles rising in pitch with the final whistle trembling –  "tuee? tuee? TUEE? tuEEuEE? tuEEuEE?". The only other similar song in the genus is that of the yellow-margined flatbill (Tolmomyias assimilis) which has a more rasping quality; flatbills in this genus are difficult to tell apart and the voice is usually the best means of recognition. The stance of this species is more horizontal than other members of the genus, and it sometimes cocks its tail.

Distribution and habitat
The grey-crowned flatbill is native to the Amazon region of South America. Its range includes Bolivia, Brazil, Colombia, Ecuador, French Guiana, Guyana, Peru, Suriname and Venezuela. It generally inhabits the middle and upper canopy of the rainforest as well as forest edges, river valleys and tall secondary forest growth. The nest is shaped like a bag and has a tubular entrance near the base; it is often hung near a wasp nest.

Status
The grey-crowned flatbill has a very wide range in the Amazon rainforest and on the lower slopes on the eastern side of the Andes. It is said to be a fairly common species and its population trend may be declining slightly but not at a rate that would cause concern, and the International Union for Conservation of Nature has assessed its conservation status as being of "least concern".

References

External links
Xeno-canto: audio recordings of the grey-crowned flatbill

grey-crowned flatbill
Birds of the Amazon Basin
Birds of the Guianas
Birds of the Atlantic Forest
grey-crowned flatbill
Birds of Brazil
Taxonomy articles created by Polbot